John I. Saeed is a British linguist and professor of linguistics at Trinity College Dublin. He is best known for his works on Somali language and semantics.
He is a Fellow of Trinity College Dublin.

Books
 Semantics, Blackwell
 Irish Sign Language: A Cognitive Linguistic Approach, with Lorraine Leeson, 2012
 Somali, 1999

References

Linguists from the United Kingdom
Year of birth missing (living people)
Fellows of Trinity College Dublin
Semanticists
Alumni of SOAS University of London
Academics of Trinity College Dublin
Living people